Urgut District is a district of Samarqand Region in Uzbekistan. The capital lies at the city Urgut.

The district consists of one city (Urgut), 7 urban-type settlements (Jartepa, Kamangaron, Gʻoʻs, Pochvon, Ispanza, Uramas, Kenagas) and 12 rural communities. It is located on the northern slope of the Zarafshan Range. There is a Navruz festival every spring equinox.

Economy
The district produces tobacco and wool and silk products. Urgut town has market days every weekend, and is one of the largest market towns in the region.  The district is home to carpets, jewels, metalwork and ceramics. The market also has smithies, tin workshops and stalls selling locally produced tea sets, clothes and traditional leather boots.

Kamongaron and Qoratepa Reservoirs were built to hold water during wet season and use during dry one.

References

External links
 "Гео каталог / Ургутский район" ("Geo Catalog - Urgut District"), photographs of Urgut District, in Russian

Samarqand Region
Districts of Uzbekistan